Babuna is a mountain in central North Macedonia, located within the Veles Municipality. It is situated by the Vardar river.

Mountains of North Macedonia